Roseanne Diab is a researcher, the Director of Gender in science, innovation, technology and engineering (SITE), a UNESCO's programme unit hosted by The World Academy of Sciences (TWAS) and former CEO of the Academy of Science of South Africa. She is Fellow of the University of KwaZulu-Natal and Emeritus Professor in the School of Environmental Sciences at the same university.

Career 
Diab has published over 86 peer-reviewed scholarly articles. She is recognised for her contribution in the field of atmospheric sciences, particularly climate change, air quality, dispersion modeling and tropospheric ozone variability. She is also a Fellow of the Society of South African Geographers and has been a member of various international bodies such as the Commission on Atmospheric Chemistry and Global Pollution (CACGP) and the International Ozone Commission (IOC).

External links

References

South African women scientists
Fellows of the African Academy of Sciences
Members of the Academy of Science of South Africa
21st-century women scientists
Academic staff of the University of KwaZulu-Natal
Year of birth missing (living people)
Living people